Screwtape appears as a fictional demon in the book The Screwtape Letters (1942) and in its sequel short story Screwtape Proposes a Toast (1959), both written by the Christian author C. S. Lewis. Screwtape is also the title of the stage adaptation of the Letters by James Forsyth (originally Dear Wormwood, 1961). 

Screwtape holds the rank of Senior Tempter and serves as the Undersecretary of his department in what Lewis envisages as a sort of infernal Civil Service. The Screwtape Letters represent his side of the correspondence with his nephew Wormwood, as mentor to the young demon who is charged with the guidance of one man. He has a secretary called Toadpipe. The Toast is Screwtape's after-dinner speech at the Tempters' Training College and  satirises American and British or English public education. 

Screwtape appears to understand very well the nature of human minds and human weaknesses, although nothing about human love. He also has a way with words and a fondness for sarcasm.

External links
 

C. S. Lewis characters
Characters in fantasy literature
Fictional demons and devils
Literary characters introduced in 1942